Mark Reed may refer to:

 Mark Reed (academic), President of St. Joseph's University
 Mark Reed (American football) (born 1959), American football quarterback
 Mark Reed (baseball) (born 1986), catcher for the Arizona Diamondbacks
 Mark Reed (figure skater), British ice dancer
 Mark Reed (physicist) (born 1955), American physicist
 Mark Reed (racing driver) (born 1969), American racing driver
 Mark Reed (sculptor) (born 1971), British sculptor
 Mark E. Reed (1866–1933), American politician in the state of Washington

See also
 Mark Read (disambiguation)
 Mark Reeds (1960–2015), ice hockey player